Starner is a surname. Notable people with the surname include:

Shelby Starner (1984–2003), American singer-songwriter and musician
Stu Starner (born 1943), American college basketball coach
Thad Starner, American academic

See also
 Starmer (surname)